Lisa Hanawalt (born June 19, 1983) is an American illustrator, writer, and cartoonist. She has published comic series, as well as three books of illustrations. She worked as the production designer and a producer of the Netflix animated series BoJack Horseman (2014–2020), and co-hosts the podcast Baby Geniuses (2012–present) with comedian Emily Heller. She created and executive produced the Adult Swim animated series, Tuca & Bertie (2019–2022).

Life and career

Early life 
Hanawalt was born in Palo Alto, California to Stanford biologists Philip Hanawalt and Graciela Spivak. Her mother was born and raised in Argentina by a family of Jewish refugees originally from Odessa.

Hanawalt attended UCLA, graduating with a B.A. in art in 2006.

Work as cartoonist and illustrator 
She is a former member of Pizza Island, a cartoonist's studio in Greenpoint, Brooklyn, which included cartoonists Kate Beaton, Domitille Collardey, Sarah Glidden, Meredith Gran, and Julia Wertz.

Her illustrations and writings have been published in print and online periodicals including The New York Times, McSweeney's, Vanity Fair, and Lucky Peach magazine. From 2011 through 2013, she was a regular contributor to The Hairpin and produced a series of illustrated film reviews.

Her first comic series, I Want You, was published in 2009 by Buenaventura Press. In 2010, Hanawalt was the first woman to win an Ignatz Award for Outstanding Comic, for "I Want You #1." In 2012, she illustrated her first children's book, Benny's Brigade, published by McSweeney's and authored by Arthur Bradford. The book stars a tiny talking walrus, rescued by two sisters with a range of magical animals at the end of the quest. The book was named a "Wildest Book of the Year" by children's lit blog 100 Scope Notes and called "exuberant and imaginative" by Foreword Reviews. The book's jacket reverse folds out into an oversized poster featuring Hanawalt's creatures from the book.

In 2013, Drawn & Quarterly published My Dirty Dumb Eyes, Hanawalt's "one-woman anthology" of comics and illustrations, including previously-commissioned works. The collected stories and shorts range from autobiographical narratives to cultural observations, frequently featuring anthropomorphic animal-people and scenes of nature rendered in bright, detailed watercolors, and likened by one reviewer to "a grown-up Richard Scarry turned absurdist social commentator."

In 2016, Drawn & Quarterly published Hot Dog Taste Test. This book is a collection of comics and illustrations often featuring animal-people in vibrant watercolors. Publishers Weekly said about her book, "Hanawalt takes a kebab skewer to the pomposity that's grown up around food and dining. The cartoons evoke an idiosyncratic absurdity akin to Roz Chast's work."

On August 21, 2018, Hanawalt released a graphic novel with Drawn & Quarterly entitled Coyote Doggirl. Unlike her previous two, Coyote Doggirl features a singular narrative and follows its titular character and her trusty steed, Red, on their escape from a vengeful bulldog and his cronies.

In 2020, Drawn & Quarterly published a collection of Hanawalt's early comics, I Want You, with a contemporary introduction.

Work in television 
The Netflix animated television series BoJack Horseman, which debuted in 2014, is designed by Hanawalt. She has been friends with show creator Raphael Bob-Waksberg since high school and previously worked with him on the webcomic Tip Me Over, Pour Me Out.

In 2019, Netflix released Tuca & Bertie, an adult animated comedy created by Hanawalt, starring Tiffany Haddish and Ali Wong. Critics called Tuca & Bertie one of the best new shows of 2019, and the show holds a rating of 100% on the review aggregator Rotten Tomatoes. Netflix cancelled the series after its first season, however the show was revived by Adult Swim in 2020.

In 2019, Hanawalt joined other WGA writers in firing their agents as part of the WGA's stand against the ATA and the practice of packaging.

Hanawalt appeared on the October 13, 2020, episode of The George Lucas Talk Show with fellow guest Ken Jennings.

Personal life 
Her longtime boyfriend is comedian and TV host Adam Conover.

Awards and recognition 
Print magazine named Hanawalt one of the best new, young designers in 2013. Her illustrated short story "On the Trail with Wylie" won a James Beard Foundation Award for humor writing in 2014.

Awards 
 2009 Ignatz Award for Outstanding Minicomic, Stay Away from Other People
 2010 Ignatz Award for Outstanding Comic, I Want You
 2011 Stumptown Award for Best Small Press, I Want You #2
 2013 Society of Illustrators Silver Medal in Editorial Illustration, "Birch Trees"
 2014 James Beard Journalism Award for Humor, "On the Trail With Wylie", Lucky Peach
 2016 Critics' Choice Award for Best Animated Series, BoJack Horseman

Nominations 
 2013 James Beard Journalism Award for Humor, "The Secret Lives of Chefs," Lucky Peach
 2015 James Beard Journalism Award for Humor, "Goodbye to all that sugar, spice, fat," Lucky Peach

Selected works 
 2012. Benny's Brigade, by Arthur Bradford. McSweeney's.  
 2013. My Dirty, Dumb Eyes. Drawn & Quarterly.  
 2016. Hot Dog Taste Test. Drawn & Quarterly. 
 2018. Coyote Doggirl. Drawn & Quarterly. 
 2020. I Want You. Drawn & Quarterly.

References

External links
 
 

1983 births
American comics writers
American women illustrators
American people of Argentine-Jewish descent
American people of Ukrainian-Jewish descent
American women artists
American female comics artists
Female comics writers
Jewish American artists
Jewish American writers
Living people
People from Palo Alto, California
American women cartoonists
American women podcasters
American podcasters
Hispanic and Latino American women in the arts
American cartoonists
21st-century American Jews
21st-century American women
Women production designers
American production designers